Matthew Montgomery may refer to:

Matthew Montgomery (actor) (born 1978), Houston, Texas actor
Matthew Montgomery (cricketer) (born 2000), South African cricketer
Matthew Scott Montgomery, actor playing the recurring character Matthew Bailey in Disney Channel comedy So Random!
Matthew Walker Montgomery (1859–1933), Lord Provost of Glasgow, 1923–26